is a Japanese bobsledder and sprinter. As a bobsledder, she competed in the two-woman event at the 2017 World Championships. As a sprinter, she is a former Japanese junior high school record holder in the 200 metres and the 2009 Japanese junior high school champion.

Personal life
She is from Iwakuni. Her father is American and her mother is Japanese.

Her role model is Japanese sprinter Momoko Takahashi.

Bobsleigh career
She made her bobsleigh debut in a Europe Cup at Königssee in February 2016, finishing first.

She finished seventh in the two-woman event at the 2017 World Championships with teammate Maria Oshigiri. As of November 2020, this is the Japanese best ever result in the bobsleigh event at the World Championships.

She made her World Cup debut in January 2017. As of November 2020, her best finish is tenth in the two-woman event at Königssee in January 2017.

World Championships

World Cup

Athletics career
She began her career in athletics at Marifu Junior High School.

In 2009, she won a gold medal in the 200 metres at the Japanese junior high school championships in a new Japanese junior high school record of 24.36 seconds.

In 2013, she won a bronze medal in the 4 × 100 metres relay at the Japanese Championships with teammates Emiri Hatsumi, Ayaka Abe and Anna Doi.

In 2017, she won a gold medal in the 100 metres and a silver medal in the 4 × 100 metres relay at the Kanto University Championships. She also won a bronze medal in the 100 metres and 4 × 100 metres relay at the Japanese University Championships.

Personal bests
100 m: 11.36 (wind: +0.6 m/s) (Osaka 2022)
200 m: 23.53 (wind: +2.6 m/s) (Osaka 2022)

Japanese Championships podium

National titles

References

External links

1995 births
Living people
Japanese people of American descent
Sportspeople from Yamaguchi Prefecture
Japanese female bobsledders
Japanese female sprinters
Nippon Sport Science University alumni